Tribute is the second album by Paul Motian to be released on the ECM label. It was released in 1974 and features performances by Motian with alto saxophonist Carlos Ward, bassist Charlie Haden and guitarists Paul Metzke and Sam Brown.

Reception
The Allmusic review by Scott Yanow awarded the album 4 stars, stating, "This effort by drummer Paul Motian does not say who the "tribute" is for. Two numbers (the leader's "Victoria" and "Song for Che") feature the trio of guitarist Sam Brown (an underrated player), bassist Charlie Haden and Motian; the remaining three songs (a pair of Motian originals and Ornette Coleman's "War Orphans") add the second guitar of Paul Metzke and the fiery alto of Carlos Ward. Fine post-bop music that contains more energy than many ECM recordings.". Describing the album as “a small classic”, The Penguin Guide to Jazz says that Motian “plays with grace and composure”, and that the use of guitars on the album is particularly interesting in the context of Motian’s later extensive work with Bill Frisell.

Track listing
 "Victoria" - 5:25  
 "Tuesday Ends Saturday" - 6:39  
 "War Orphans" (Ornette Coleman) - 7:28  
 "Sod House" - 9:51  
 "Song for Ché" (Charlie Haden) - 8:33

All compositions by Paul Motian except as indicated

Personnel
Paul Motian - drums, percussion
Carlos Ward - alto saxophone 
Sam Brown - acoustic and electric guitars
Paul Metzke - electric guitar
Charlie Haden - bass

References 

1974 albums
Paul Motian albums
ECM Records albums
Albums produced by Manfred Eicher